The Karnataka Ratna is the highest civilian honour of the State of Karnataka, India. It is awarded in recognition of a person's extraordinary contribution in any field. It was instituted in the year 1992 by Chief Minister S Bangarappa  by the Government of Karnataka. A total of ten persons have received this award.

The Award 

The Award comes with a gold medal weighing 50 gm, a citation, a memento and a shawl.

List of recipients

References

External links
 Karnataka Ratna recipients

Civil awards and decorations of Karnataka

Awards established in 1992
Awards disestablished in 2009